Jean-Claude Gobé (born April 11, 1949) is a Quebec politician. He served as the member for LaFontaine in the Quebec National Assembly as a member of the Quebec Liberal Party from 1985 until 2003. He left the Liberals to sit as an Independent shortly before his term in the National Assembly ended. Until resigning in 2018, he was the leader of the Official Opposition in the City of Laval as head of Action Laval.

Biography
Gobé was born in Charleville, France and studied at the College Sainte-Jeanne D'Arc in Orléans and then at the Academy of Montpelier. He served in the 7th Infantry Regiment of the Navy in Fréjus from 1967 to 1971, before emigrating to Canada in 1972.

After serving as a sales manager and then head of Renault Canada, he was director of Ademco and then of Comterm. He was managing director of Norma Rental from 1980 to 1985.

Political career

Gobé ran in the 1985 Quebec provincial election for the seat of LaFontaine against former Parti Québécois minister Marcel Léger and won with a narrow majority as Robert Bourassa became Premier for the second time. He served as a backbench supporter in the government and was re-elected in 1989. He served as a parliamentary secretary in the short-lived government of Daniel Johnson Jr.

He was reelected in 1994 and 1998, never facing a serious challenge. On February 20, 2005, Gobé quit the Quebec Liberal party after Leader Jean Charest requested he step aside for Tony Tomassi. He subsequently did not seek re-election in 2003.

After some time working at Iris as the Vice President of Business Development, he ran for the Liberal Party of Canada federally in 2004 in the riding of La Pointe-de-l'Île and then in 2006 in the riding of Alfred-Pellan, finishing a distant second both times. He then became an advisor to the ADQ leader Gérard Deltell and the head of the ADQ riding association in LaFontaine until the party folded.

In February 2013, Gobé founded the Action Laval party. He ran for mayor of Laval and lost to Marc Demers.

Electoral record

Federal

Provincial

Municipal

References 

1949 births
Living people
People from Marne (department)
French emigrants to Quebec
French Navy officers
Independent MNAs in Quebec
Candidates in the 2004 Canadian federal election
Candidates in the 2006 Canadian federal election
Quebec Liberal Party MNAs
Quebec municipal politicians
Politicians from Laval, Quebec
Liberal Party of Canada candidates for the Canadian House of Commons
20th-century Canadian politicians